Heart of Hearts is Bobby Vinton's twenty-sixth studio album and his second studio album for ABC Records. It was released in 1975. "Beer Barrel Polka" is the album's most successful single, peaking at # 5 on the Adult Contemporary Chart. A second single was "Wooden Heart" a #23 Adult Contemporary hit with partial Polish lyrics. Other notable tracks include Morris Albert's hit "Feelings" and Vinton's own composition  "Adios Amigo" which was a big country hit for Marty Robbins.

Track listing
Side A
 "Lovely Lady" (Riccardi, Shannon) - 3:18
 "Feelings" (Morris Albert) - 3:38
 "I Won't Give Up" (Baldan Bambo, Piccoli, Altman) - 3:24
 "Why Can't I Get Over You" (Bobby Vinton, Gene Allen) - 2:09
 "Adios Amigo" (Ray Girado, Bobby Vinton) - 3:18
 "Wooden Heart" (Bert Kaempfert, Kay Twomey, Fred Wise, Ben Weisman) - 2:23

Side B
 "You've Got Your Momma's Eyes" (Flax, Lambert) - 3:39
 "My Song" (Danny Janssen, Bobby Hart) - 2:31
 "Charlie" (Burt Bacharach, Robert Russell) - 3:38
 "Polka Pose" (Bobby Vinton) - 2:36
 "Beer Barrel Polka" (Lew Brown, Wladimir A. Timm, Jaromír Vejvoda) - 2:32

Personnel
Arrangers: Joe Reisman, Al Capps, Mike Melvoin, Burt Bacharach
Engineers: Tommy Vicari, Armin Steiner, Ray Gerhart
Studios: Sound Lab, A&M
Photography: Eddie Sanderson
Lettering: Bob Simmons
Art Direction: Martin Donald

Charts
Album - Billboard (North America)

Singles - Billboard (North America)

References

1975 albums
Bobby Vinton albums
Albums arranged by Burt Bacharach
Albums arranged by Mike Melvoin
ABC Records albums